Perosa Canavese is a comune (municipality) in the Metropolitan City of Turin in the Italian region Piedmont, located about 40 km northeast of Turin.

Perosa Canavese borders the following municipalities: Pavone Canavese, Romano Canavese, San Martino Canavese, and Scarmagno.

References

Cities and towns in Piedmont
Canavese